The  is a type of signal baton and Japanese war fan. Once held by military leaders (such as daimyō) and priests in the past, it is used in the modern day by umpires in sumo wrestling.

Description
Gunbai, from the Sino-Japanese roots meaning "military-apportioned [fan]", were a specialized form of fan used by samurai officers in Japan to communicate commands to their troops. Unlike regular fans, gunbai were solid, not folding, and usually made of wood, wood covered with metal, or solid metal.

It is also a key accessory of a gyōji (referee) in professional sumo. The main use is at the end of a bout, when the gyoji decides the victor and  points the gunbai to either the east or west position (each wrestler is assigned to start from either the east or west position each tournament day). Reflecting this, the gyōji's decision itself is often informally referred to as a "gunbai". If this is called into question and the judges  hold a consultation, a decision to uphold the gyōji's judgement is announced as gunbai-dōri (軍配通り), literally "according to the gunbai", while a decision to overturn it is gunbai-sashichigae (軍配差し違え), literally "gunbai mispointed." In modern times, all gyōji will take either the family name Kimura or Shikimori as their professional name, depending on the tradition of the stable that they join.  There are exceptions to this naming convention, but they are rare. Additionally there are different styles to how a gyōji will hold his gunbai depending on which family he is in. The Kimura family hold their gunbai with their palm and figures faced up, while the Shikimori will hold theirs with their palm and figures faced down.

Family Crest (Mon)
The Gunbai-Uchiwa, along with the Touchiwa (Karauchiwa), is also used as a Mon (family crest).

See also

 Gohei
 Japanese war fan
 Ruyi (scepter)
 Saihai
 Samurai signal devices
 Shaku
 Ōnusa

References

Japanese words and phrases
Sumo terminology
Military communication in feudal Japan
Ventilation fans
Exorcism in Shinto
Shinto in Japan
Wands
Ritual weapons
Honorary weapons
Ceremonial weapons